Opingivik Island is an uninhabited Baffin Island offshore island located in the Arctic Archipelago in Nunavut's Qikiqtaaluk Region.

A second, smaller Opingivik Island lies in Diana Bay, just south of Diana Island.

References

External links 
 Opingivik Island in the Atlas of Canada - Toporama; Natural Resources Canada
 Opingivik Island (Diana Bay) in the Atlas of Canada - Toporama; Natural Resources Canada

Islands of Baffin Island
Islands of Cumberland Sound
Uninhabited islands of Qikiqtaaluk Region